Boredom, tedium, ennui, is an emotional or psychological state of mind.

Boredom may also refer to:

 Boredoms, Japanese rock band
 Wolf W-11 Boredom Fighter, a 1979 biplane designed to resemble WWI fighters
 The Boredom of Haruhi Suzumiya, aka Boredom, a 2003 novel of the Suzumiya Haruhi light novel series
 "Скучай", aka "Boredom", an 1874 song by Modest Mussorgsky from the compositional work Sunless
 "Boredom", a 1969 song by Procol Harum from the album A Salty Dog
 "Boredom", a 1977 song by the Buzzcocks from the EP Spiral Scratch
Boredom (Tyler, the Creator song)
 "Dokolica", aka "Boredom", a 1982  song by Električni Orgazam
 Boredom room, employee banishment strategy of boring work
 Boredom (film), a 2012 Canadian satirical documentary film

See also
 Bore (disambiguation)
 Bored (disambiguation)
 Boring (disambiguation)
 Ennui (disambiguation)